Elections were held in Soccsksargen for seats in the House of Representatives of the Philippines on May 10, 2010.

The candidate with the most votes won that district's seat for the 15th Congress of the Philippines.

Note that in Cotabato City, although a part of this region, the voters elect their representative via Maguindanao's 1st district. Cotabato City is independent from any province and is a part of the Soccsksargen region, but is usually grouped with Maguindanao by the National Statistics Office.

Summary

Cotabato (North Cotabato)

1st District
Incumbent Emmylou Taliño-Mendoza is in her third consecutive term already and is ineligible for reelection; she is running as governor of Cotabato. Lakas-Kampi-CMD nominated incumbent governor Jesus Sacdalan as their nominee in this district.

2nd District
Bernardo Piñol, Jr. is the incumbent.

The result of the election is under protest in the House of Representatives Electoral Tribunal.

Sarangani

World-renowned boxer Manny Pacquiao is running once again after being defeated in South Cotabato's congressional race to incumbent Rep. Darlene Antonino-Custodio in 2007. As such, he moved to Sarangani and is vying for its open congressional seat left by out going Rep. Erwin Chiongbian. Pacquiao is running his own People's Champ Movement which is co-endorsed by the Nacionalista Party. He will face Rep. Chiongbian's third brother, Roy Chiongbian, a local businessman. Chiongbian is co-endorsed by the local Sarangani Reconciliation and Reformation Organization and Lakas Kampi CMD.

South Cotabato

1st District
The highly urbanized city of General Santos is a part of South Cotabato's first district.

Incumbent Darlene Antonino-Custodio is in her third consecutive term already and his run for Mayor of General Santos. The Nationalist People's Coalition nominated General Santos mayor Pedro Acharon Jr. in this district.

2nd District
Incumbent Arthur Pingoy, Jr. is in his third consecutive term already and is ineligible for reelection and running for governor. Lakas-Kampi-CMD nominated Hilario de Pedro III in this district.

Sultan Kudarat

1st District
Pax Mangudadatu is the incumbent.

2nd District
Arnold Go is the incumbent.

References

External links
Official website of the Commission on Elections

2010 Philippine general election
Lower house elections in Soccsksargen